WooCommerce is an open-source e-commerce plugin for WordPress. It is designed for small to large-sized online merchants using WordPress. Launched on September 27, 2011, the plugin quickly became popular for its simplicity to install and customize and for the market position of the base product as freeware (even though many of its optional extensions are paid and proprietary).

History
WooCommerce was first developed by WordPress theme developer WooThemes, who hired Mike Jolley and James Koster, developers at Jigowatt, to work on a fork of Jigoshop that became WooCommerce. In January 2020, it was estimated that WooCommerce is used by around 3.9 million websites.

In November 2014, the first WooConf, a conference focusing on eCommerce using WooCommerce, was held in San Francisco, California. It attracted 300 attendees.

In May 2015, WooThemes and WooCommerce were acquired by Automattic, operator of WordPress.com and core contributor to the WordPress software.

In December 2020, WooCommerce acquired MailPoet, a popular WordPress newsletter management plugin. Subsequently, WooCommerce launched WooCommerce Mobile App for iOS and Android. The app lets WooCommerce store owners view and manage their stores from mobile devices.

Usage
WooCommerce is used by a number of high-traffic websites such as Small Press Expo.
For the 3rd week of September 2015, Trends indicated that WooCommerce ran on 30% of e-commerce sites and millions of active installs. Ecommerce is rapidly growing worldwide and WooCommerce has over 39 million downloads as a plugin and is currently active on more than three million websites and is the most popular eCommerce platform in 2018. WooCommerce serves approximately 4% of the top million HTML pages. In 2015, statistics show that the percentage of online stores that utilize WooCommerce through Wordpress.org's plugin is more than 30% of all stores. The current 2021 market share for WooCommerce is 29% of the top 1 million sites using eCommerce technologies.

Since Automattic's acquisition WooCommerce has kept gaining market share to become one of the leading E-commerce platforms on the Internet.

Themes 

With many WooCommerce-ready themes sold on third party websites, it makes it difficult to exactly estimate how many themes can be associated with this WordPress plugin, but here are some WooCommerce stats for the bigger theme providers.
 There are 1,300 WooCommerce themes on ThemeForest.
 The WordPress.org theme directory has 1122 WooCommerce themes.

Extensions 

WooCommerce has attracted significant popularity because the base product, in addition to many extensions and plugins, is free and open-source. WooCommerce has hundreds of extensions and over 1,000 plugins. In addition, there are thousands of paid add-ons for fixed prices. Many Premium Themes now offer capability with WooCommerce as well as plugins that make a theme framework compatible.

Notable WooCommerce extensions include:
 WooCommerce Bookings: Which allows users to sell blocks of time as appointments.
 WooCommerce Memberships: which allows the user to restrict access to certain parts of their WordPress website, and sell access to these parts of the website.

WooExpert Partner program 
Instead of a certification program WooCommerce uses an official partnership program. WooCommerce recommends users to use these WooExperts for their WooCommerce projects. Suppliers can apply to become a partner and by doing so will undergo a multi-stage application process that includes skill evaluation and an interview. Throughout the process WooCommerce aim to assess familiarity with WooCommerce core and extensions. The partnership program had either a Gold, Silver or Bronze level until late 2017, when it moved to a flat "verified WooExpert" system.

Revenues 
A study conducted in 2017 by Todd Wilkins, Head of WooCommerce, suggests that WooCommerce stores would collectively account for nearly $10 billion in sales.

See also

 Comparison of shopping cart software
 List of online payment service providers
 WordPress
 WooCommerce vs Mercado Shops

References

External links
 

Free e-commerce software
Free software programmed in PHP
Online payments
WordPress
Companies of South Africa